"Der Tanz der Schatten" is a 1996 single by Theatre of Tragedy. The title translates to "The Dance of the Shadows."

History
The single was released on September 16, 1996. It was the only single to be released from the album Velvet Darkness They Fear.

Track list
"Der Tanz der Schatten" (Club mix) 05:13
"Black as the Devil Painteth" 05:26
"A Hamlet for a Slothful Vassal" 04:05
"Der Tanz der Schatten" (album version) 05:28

Covers
The Brazilian Theatre of Tragedy cover band Velvet of Tragedy sang the song on their live DVD, which they released in the Summer of 2010.

References

1996 singles
Theatre of Tragedy songs
1996 songs